Managua is a department in Nicaragua. It covers an area of 3,465 km2 and has a population of 1,559,774 (2021 estimate), making it the country's most populated department. The capital is the city of Managua, which is also the capital of Nicaragua. The department has two coastlines, on the Pacific Ocean and on Lake Managua, but does not border Lake Nicaragua.

Municipalities 
 Ciudad Sandino
 El Crucero
 Managua
 Mateare
 San Francisco Libre
 San Rafael del Sur
 Ticuantepe
 Tipitapa
 Villa Carlos Fonseca

References 

 
Departments of Nicaragua